"Life Support" is a song by American rapper YoungBoy Never Broke Again, released on September 10, 2021, as the fourth single from his third studio album Sincerely, Kentrell. It was produced by Jason Goldberg, Ravis, Stunner Samples, Smash David, and SMPLGTWY.

Composition
Jordan Rose of Complex wrote that the lyrics of the song "weave a tale of survival". YoungBoy covers "heavy topics" such as taking his grandmother to chemotherapy, describes how his pain "keeps him going" and feeling like he is living on life support.

Music video
A music video for the song was directed by Rich Porter. It contains snippets of YoungBoy, and shows him driving around town, spending time with his girlfriend, and working in the studio.

Charts

Certifications

References

2021 singles
2021 songs
Atlantic Records singles
Songs written by YoungBoy Never Broke Again
YoungBoy Never Broke Again songs